Lauren Williams (born September 9, 1996) is a Canadian professional women's ice hockey player with the PWHPA. An alumna of the Wisconsin Badgers women's ice hockey program, Williams was the first pick overall in the 2018 CWHL Draft by the Blades.

Playing career
Williams won a gold medal with Team Ontario Blue at the 2012 Canadian U18 National Championships.

University of Wisconsin
Williams joined the University of Wisconsin for the 2014–15 season. In her senior year, Williams was named an alternate captain.

CWHL
Williams was selected by the Worcester Blades with the first pick overall in the 2018 CWHL Draft. As the first overall pick, the Blades pre-signed her for the 2018–19 season. She was named the Blades only participant of the 4th Canadian Women's Hockey League All-Star Game.

Career statistics

Source:

Awards and honours
Academic All-Big Ten team (2017–18) 
WCHA All-Academic Team (2015–16, 2016–17, 2017–18) 
WCHA Scholar Athlete (2015–16, 2016–17, 2017–18)

Personal
Williams majored in sociology and psychology at the University of Wisconsin. With teammate Annie Pankowski, the two volunteered with Occupaws, an organization that trains guide dogs for the visually impaired in Wisconsin and bordering states.

References

External links
 

1996 births
Living people
Canadian women's ice hockey defencemen
Canadian expatriate ice hockey players in the United States
Professional Women's Hockey Players Association players
Wisconsin Badgers women's ice hockey players
Boston Blades players
Ice hockey people from Ontario
Sportspeople from Windsor, Ontario
Djurgårdens IF Hockey Dam players